Republic-Michigamme High School (RMHS) services the communities of Republic and Michigamme, Michigan. It is operated by the Republic-Michigamme School District. The current building was opened in 1964 and encompasses kindergarten to grade 12.

The school's mascot is the red-tailed hawk, and the school colors are orange and black. The Hawks basketball team competes in Class D of the Michigan High School Athletic Association's Skyline Conference.

Notable alumni
Jason Cameron - actor and model (1987 graduate)
Jeffrey S. Williams - writer and Civil War historian (1989 graduate)

References

External links
 Republic-Michigamme Schools website

Public high schools in Michigan
School buildings completed in 1964
Schools in Marquette County, Michigan
Public middle schools in Michigan
Public elementary schools in Michigan